Robert Hunter (1883–1962) was an English professional footballer who played as a winger.

References

1883 births
1962 deaths
People from the Borough of Scarborough
English footballers
Association football wingers
Filey F.C. players
Grimsby Town F.C. players
English Football League players
Sportspeople from Scarborough, North Yorkshire